is a Japanese aerobatics pilot and race pilot of the Red Bull Air Race World Championship. He started glider flight training in 1991 because it was an inexpensive way to fly. Muroya went to the United States privately to earn his airplane license at the age of twenty.

After that, he worked long hours to earn enough money to get his training in the United States for a period of two months a year. At the same time, he continued glider training in Japan and learned long-distance flight techniques in Australia.

In 2009 he participated in the Red Bull Air Race World Championship as first Japanese and first Asian pilot. Special Team Mate Robert Fry joined as Team coordinator.
In the final race in Barcelona, Spain he took 6th place. In 2017 he became Red Bull Air Race's World Champion. 

Until now, he has held some 170 air-shows over 12 years without incident.

In 2021, Muroya partnered with Lexus to launch Lexus/Pathfinder Air Racing, a joint team competing in the Air Race World Championship.

Racing record

Red Bull Air Race World Championship

Legend: * CAN: Cancelled * DNP: Did not take part * DNS: Did not start * DSQ: Disqualified

Gallery

See also
 Competition aerobatics

References

External links 

  
 Red Bull Air Race World Championship - Yoshihide Muroya

1973 births
Living people
People from Nara Prefecture
Japanese aviators
Red Bull Air Race World Championship pilots
Aerobatic pilots